The 2013 IIHF Women's World Championships was the 15th world championship sanctioned by the International Ice Hockey Federation (IIHF) and was the last world championship before the 2014 Winter Olympics. The tournament was hosted in Ottawa, Ontario, Canada, and was primarily played in small community arenas, including the Nepean Sportsplex, but most games were held in Scotiabank Place arena.

The United States won their fifth world title with a 3–2 win over Canada, while Russia defeated Finland, 2–0, to win its second bronze medal in tournament history.

The tournament was held at Ottawa, Ontario, Canada, the site of the first Women's World Championship in 1990.  Organizers set a tournament record of over 150,000 tickets sold, and a preliminary round contest between Canada and Finland set an all-time attendance mark for a women's hockey game of 18,013. Canada's Marie-Philip Poulin was named top forward and most valuable player after leading the tournament with 12 points. Finland's Jenni Hiirikoski was named top defenceman and Russia's Nadezhda Alexandrova was named top goaltender.

Top Division 
The Top Division of the world championship was contested between eight teams from April 2 to April 9, 2013 in Ottawa, Ontario, Canada. It was the second time the tournament was held in Canada's capital city as Ottawa hosted the inaugural Women's World Championship in 1990.  The women's game had undergone a considerable period of growth in the intervening 23 years; the 1990 tournament was primarily played in small community arenas, but the majority of the 2013 event was held in the 20,000 seat Scotiabank Place arena.

The host city set a tournament record by selling over 150,000 tickets for the tournament, but gate attendance fell short of the record of 119,231 set in 2007. Such discrepancies are not unusual at IIHF events, where games are often sold in packages in order to boost attendance figures of less attractive fixtures. However, both actual attendance and ticket sales were below the ambitious pre-tournament objective of 200,000 spectators relayed to the media by the organizers.

According to Hockey Canada, the announced crowd of 18,013 for the preliminary round game between Canada and Finland set an all-time record for a women's hockey game. A large component of the crowd was made up of female players competing in the Ontario Women's Hockey Association provincial championships, which was scheduled to coincide with the Women's World Championship.  The game surpassed the previous record of 16,347, also set in Ottawa, for a pre-Olympic exhibition game in 2010.

Overnight data indicates that an average 795,000 viewers watched the gold medal game in Canada, making it the highest rated Women's World Championship final in TSN's history.

Teams

The preliminary round was divided into two pools and introduced a new format that placed the top four seeds into Group A, and the bottom four in Group B. The top two finishers in Group A advanced directly to the semifinals, while the two remaining teams and the top two in Group B played a quarterfinal round. The change in format helped reduce the number of severely one-sided contests in a tournament praised by IIHF president René Fasel for its increasing competitiveness.

Each team's roster for the 2013 IIHF Women's World Championship consisted of at least 15 skaters (forwards, and defencemen) and 2 goaltenders, and at most 20 skaters and 3 goaltenders. All eight participating nations, through the confirmation of their respective national associations, had to submit a roster by the first IIHF directorate.

Group A

Group B

 — promoted to Top Division pool for 2013

Officials
The IIHF selected six referees and nine linesmen to work the 2013 IIHF Women's World Championship. They were the following:

Referees
  Melanie Bordeleau
  Marie Picavet
  Nicole Hertrich
  Joy Tottman
  Aina Hove
  Kristine Langley

Linesmen
  Denise Caughey
  Stephanie Gagnon
  Ilona Novotná
  Zuzana Svobodová
  Johanna Tauriainen

Linesmen
  Michaela Kúdelová
  Therese Bjorkman
  Kate Connolly
  Laura Johnson

Tournament highlights
The opening night featured a match-up of the game's top powers, Canada and the United States. The contest ended with a 3–2 Canadian win, decided by a shootout, in what was viewed as a preview of the probable gold medal final. The Canadian team made headlines by wearing yellow and black uniforms in lieu of the team's usual red and white colors. This was part of a promotion for the Nike-backed Livestrong cancer awareness initiative, whose founder Lance Armstrong had confessed to doping a few months earlier. Nike hoped to attach the Livestrong brand to other athletes, and the jerseys were subsequently auctioned in support of the charity. Both teams easily won their remaining pool games, to earn byes to the semifinals.

After failing to win a game in the 2012 tournament, Russia rebounded in 2013 by winning all of its pool games to lead Group B. It clinched first place with a 4–0 victory over Sweden, a nation that entered the tournament with high medal hopes but was instead forced to play a best-of-three series against the Czech Republic to avoid relegation. The Swedes, who hosted the next tournament in 2015, retained their position in the top division by winning the series against the Czechs by 2–1 (SO) and 4–0 scores.  The Czech Republic, who were promoted from Division 1A for this tournament, were relegated back to the lower division.

In the medal round, Germany joined Russia in reaching the quarterfinal round from Group B, while Finland and Switzerland qualified out of Group A. The Russians won their fourth consecutive game in the tournament by defeating the 2012 bronze medal-winning Switzerland team 2–1 to earn a semifinal game against Canada. Forty-year-old Yekaterina Pashkevich, the eldest player in the tournament, said that her nation's turnaround following a winless 2012 tournament could be attributed to increased "drive and motivation" in the country as a result of Russia hosting the 2014 Winter Olympics. In the second semifinal, Finland beat Germany 1–0 to earn a match-up with the United States. Goaltender Meeri Raisanen recorded the shutout after unexpectedly being named her team's starter in favour of Finland's number-one goaltender, Noora Raty.

Russia's unbeaten run came to an end in the semifinals as they were routed by Canada, 8–1. In a closer contest, the United States defeated Finland, 3–0. The results set up the 15th consecutive gold medal match-up between the two North American rivals.

In the bronze medal game, the Russians captured only their second medal in tournament history with a 2–0 victory over Finland. They earned the win on the goaltending of Nadezhda Alexandrova, who stopped all 32 shots she faced for the shutout.

The United States defeated Canada, 3–2 to win its fifth world championship in seven years. The winning goal was scored by Amanda Kessel for the American team that outshot their opponents 30–16. The goaltending of Shannon Szabados was credited with keeping Canada close as Americans used their speed advantage to overcome Canada's size and physical presence.

Preliminary round

Group A

All times are local (UTC−4).

Group B

All times are local (UTC−4).

Relegation series
Best of three.

All times are local (UTC−4).

Final round

Quarterfinals

Semifinals

Fifth place game

Bronze medal game

Gold medal game

Ranking and statistics

Final standings

Scoring leaders
List shows the top 10 skaters sorted by points, then goals.

GP = Games played; G = Goals; A = Assists; Pts = Points; +/− = Plus/minus; PIM = Penalties In MinutesSource: IIHF.COM

Leading goaltenders
Only the top five goaltenders, based on save percentage, who have played 40% of their team's minutes are included in this list.
TOI = Time On Ice (minutes:seconds); SA = Shots against; GA = Goals against; GAA = Goals against average; Sv% = Save percentage; SO = ShutoutsSource: IIHF.com

Tournament Awards
Media All-Stars
Goaltender: 
Defense: , 
Best players selected by the directorate:
Best Goaltender: 
Best Defenceman: 
Best Forward:

Division I

Division I Group A
The Division I Group A tournament was played in Stavanger, Norway, from 7 to 13 April 2013.

Division I Group B
The Division I Group B tournament was played in Strasbourg, France, from 7 to 13 April 2013.

Division II

Division II Group A
The Division II Group A tournament was played in Auckland, New Zealand, from 8 to 14 April 2013.

Division II Group B
The Division II Group B tournament was played in Puigcerdà, Spain, from 1 to 7 April 2013.

Division II Group B Qualification
The Division II Group B Qualification tournament was played in İzmir, Turkey, from 7 to 9 December 2012.

See also 
 2013 IIHF World Women's U18 Championship

References

External links 
 Official website of IIHF
 Full event listing

 
IIHF Women's World Ice Hockey Championships
World
World
International ice hockey competitions hosted by Canada
Ice hockey competitions in Ottawa
April 2013 sports events in Canada
Women's ice hockey competitions in Canada
2010s in Ottawa
2013 in Ontario